The 1989 Vuelta a España was the 44th edition of the Vuelta a España, one of cycling's Grand Tours. The Vuelta began in A Coruña, with a stage on 24 April, and Stage 11 occurred on 4 May with a stage to Lleida. The race finished in Madrid on 15 May.

Stage 1
24 April 1989 — A Coruña to A Coruña,

Stage 2
25 April 1989 — A Coruña to Santiago de Compostela,

Stage 3a
26 April 1989 — Vigo to Vigo,  (TTT)

Stage 3b
26 April 1989 — Vigo to Ourense,

Stage 4
27 April 1989 — Ourense to Pontevedra,

Stage 5
28 April 1989 — La Bañeza to Béjar,

Stage 6
29 April 1989 — Béjar to Ávila,

Stage 7
30 April 1989 — Ávila to Toledo,

Stage 8
1 May 1989 — Toledo to Albacete,

Stage 9
2 May 1989 — Albacete to Gandia,

Stage 10
3 May 1989 — Gandia to Benicàssim,

Stage 11
4 May 1989 — Vinaròs to Lleida,

References

01
1989,01